Adhemar Canavesi (18 August 1903 – 14 November 1984) was a Uruguayan footballer who played as a defender. He was member of the Uruguayan team which won gold medal at the 1928 Olympics. After beginning his club career with Bella Vista, he moved to Peñarol in 1928.

Career statistics

International

References

External links
Profile
 
 

1903 births
1984 deaths
Uruguayan people of Italian descent
Uruguayan footballers
Footballers at the 1928 Summer Olympics
Olympic footballers of Uruguay
Olympic gold medalists for Uruguay
Uruguay international footballers
Olympic medalists in football
Uruguayan Primera División players
C.A. Bella Vista players
Peñarol players
Medalists at the 1928 Summer Olympics
Association football defenders
Footballers from Montevideo